Mill Hollow is a valley in northern Douglas County the Ozarks of southern Missouri.

The stream in the valley is fed by a perennial spring with its source near the upper reaches of the valley. Missouri Route 5 runs parallel to the valley on the southeast side. The valley is the location of Ava Roadside Park which lies adjacent to Route 5 five miles north of Ava.

Mill Hollow was named for a mill which once stood in the valley in the 1830s.

References

Valleys of Douglas County, Missouri
Valleys of Missouri